= Tural Allahverdiyev =

Azerbaijani judoka (born 2000)

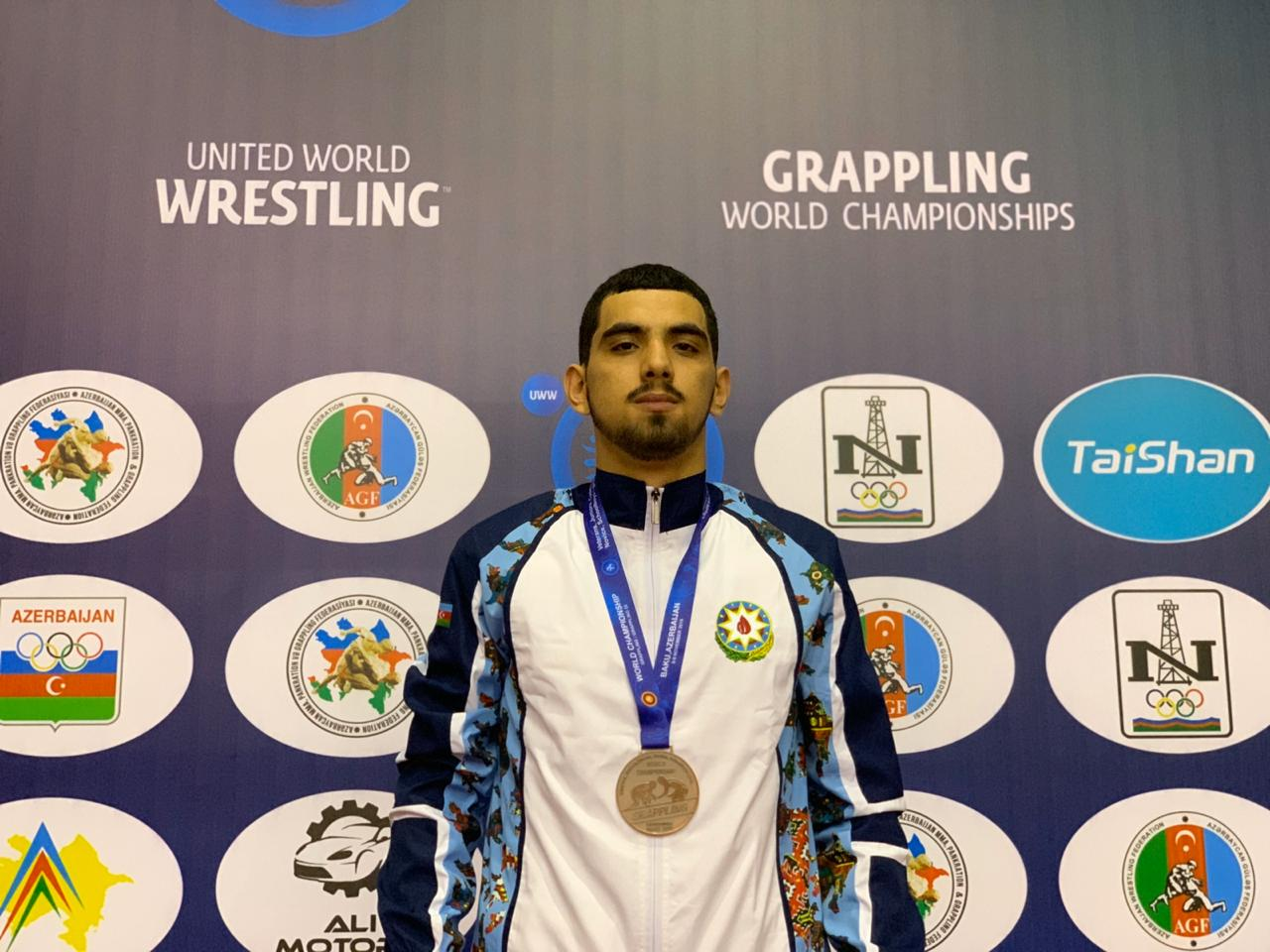
- World Championship Ceremony

Personal information
- Full name: Tural Hikmat oglu Allahverdiyev
- Born: 29 July 2000 (age 25) Azerbaijan
- Height: 1.75 m (5 ft 9 in)
- Weight: 66 kg (146 lb)

Sport
- Country: Azerbaijan
- Sport: Judo
- Event: 66 kg
Medal record
Representing Azerbaijan
World Championships
Gold medal – first place	2017 Tehran Catet	-52 kg.
Gold medal – first place	2018 Tbilisi	-57 kg.
Bronze medal – third place	2019 Baku	-62 kg.
World Cup
Gold medal – first place	2019 Novi-Sad	-62 kg.
Silver medal – second place	2018 Baku	-57 kg.

Tural Hikmat oglu Allahverdiyev (born July 29, 2000) is an Azerbaijani judoka.

== Life ==
Tural Allahverdiyev was born on July 29, 2000, in Azerbaijan to Nizhny Novgorod in the Russian Federation. After living in the Russian Federation for eight years, the Tural family returned to their homeland Azerbaijan. At the age of 8, Tural began learning the secrets of Greco-Roman Wrestling. At this time Tural started wrestling, and Tural, who tried several sports, finally practiced Judo at the Yasamal Sports Club.

Tural is also a member of the Azerbaijan National Team in Sambo, Grappling, Mas-Wrestling, Zorkhana and National-Wrestling.
